The 2012 James Madison Dukes football team represented James Madison University in the 2012 NCAA Division I FCS football season. They were led by 14th year head coach Mickey Matthews and played their home games at Bridgeforth Stadium and Zane Showker Field. They are a member of the Colonial Athletic Association. They finished the season 7–4, 5–3 in CAA play to finish in sixth place.

Schedule

Source: Schedule

Ranking movements

References

James Madison
James Madison Dukes football seasons
James Madison Dukes football